The Taipei Economic and Cultural Office in Mexico; (Spanish: Oficina Económica y Cultural de Taipei en México) represents the interests of Taiwan in Mexico in the absence of formal diplomatic relations, functioning as a de facto embassy. Its counterpart in Taiwan is the Mexican Trade Services Documentation and Cultural Office in Taipei.

It is located in the Miguel Hidalgo borough.
 
The Office was established in 1993. Previously, Taiwan was represented by the Far East Trade Service Inc..
The Office is headed by a Representative, Carlos Liao.

See also
 Mexico–Taiwan relations
 List of diplomatic missions of Taiwan
 List of diplomatic missions in Mexico

References

External links
 Oficina Económica y Cultural de Taipei en México

 

Taiwan
Mexico
Miguel Hidalgo, Mexico City
Organizations established in 1993
1993 establishments in Mexico